The Make A Child Smile Organization, also known as MACS, was a source of support to children with chronic or life-threatening illnesses and their families founded in May 1998 by Alexandra d'Avila Bakker. Emotional support was provided by creating the opportunity for people to visit the MACS website and learn about the children and their illnesses.

A picture and biography of children battling chronic illnesses were published on the website. Hundreds of 'net surfers, schools, service organizations, girls/boys scouts and church groups, used the MACS website as a philanthropic project, where they could send cards, letters and small gifts to the featured children and their siblings, through postal mail to cheer them up during their difficult time.

Due to the lack of funding and staffing, Make A Child Smile closed down at the end of 2011, after 13½ years in operation.

In the news 
MACS has been featured on many TV news broadcasts, magazines and newspapers, including:

 The Maury Povich Show
 Redbook
 Seventeen
 Nick Jr.
 Family Circle

References

External links
Make A Child Smile - Official website
Post Pals - Similar to MACS (no affiliation) but helping children in the UK

Charities based in Florida
Children's charities based in the United States